Hoyt Stoddard Curtin (September 9, 1922 – December 3, 2000) was an American composer and music producer, the primary musical director for the Hanna-Barbera animation studio from its beginnings with The Ruff & Reddy Show in 1957 until his retirement in 1986, except from 1965 to 1972, when the primary music director was Ted Nichols.

Biography
Curtin was a native of Downey, California, and had one son, Chris, with his wife Elizabeth.

In the 1950s Curtin was an in-demand composer for TV commercials. He first met William Hanna and Joseph Barbera when he worked on a Schlitz beer commercial they were producing for MGM in 1957.

"About two weeks later they called and had a lyric they read over the phone. Could I write a tune for it? I called back in 5 minutes and sang it to them ... silence ... uh oh, I bombed out ... the next thing I heard was a deal to record it! Ruff & Reddy. At that moment they had quit at MGM and started their own company. All of our first main titles were done in that fashion. Huckleberry Hound, Quick Draw McGraw, etc.".

He was the composer of many of the Hanna-Barbera cartoons' popular theme songs, including The Flintstones until 1981, Top Cat, The Jetsons, Jonny Quest, Super Friends, Josie and the Pussycats, The Smurfs, and The New Scooby-Doo Movies and all its spinoffs until 1986. Beginning in 1960, Curtin also composed many of the stock tunes used as incidental music in the various Hanna-Barbera series, along with the jingle heard underneath Hanna-Barbera's closing logo in 1979. He also composed two of the tunes heard in the background in 1959's Plan 9 from Outer Space, although he was embarrassed by the film's poor quality. The following year, Curtin was the composer for the animated series Q.T. Hush, one of the first cartoons to appear in color.

His other credits include the score for the science-fiction film Mesa of Lost Women (1953), Ed Wood's Jail Bait (1954, as Hoyt Kurtain), Timber Tramps (1975), C.H.O.M.P.S. (1979), and the music for the 1978 Sandy Frank cartoon Battle of the Planets for which a soundtrack was released in 2000. He also composed and conducted the music for Thrillerama Adventure, a two-projector attempt at replicating Cinerama, in 1955 with a 38-piece orchestra.

In a 1999 interview Curtin said, "My pianist, Jack Cookerly, invented the synthesizer as we know it for Jonny Quest. It was made of orange crates with a keyboard and thousands of vacuum tubes! A regular jazz band, (of) 4 trumpets, 6 [trom]bones, 5 woodwind doublers, 5-man rhythm section including percussion"; was used to record the music for the Jonny Quest cartoon. The Jonny Quest session was done "...at RCA in Hollywood. Alvin Stoller or Frankie Capp usually played drums. I always tried to get the same guys where possible. They were the ones who could swing and read like demons."

Death
Curtin died on December 3, 2000, in Thousand Oaks, California, at age 78. He was on the tennis court playing a match when he fell to the ground and was pronounced dead by the paramedics.

References

External links
 
 

1922 births
2000 deaths
20th-century American composers
American television composers
Burials at Valley Oaks Memorial Park
Hanna-Barbera people
Male television composers
Musicians from Downey, California
People from Downey, California
Songwriters from California
USC Thornton School of Music alumni
Animation composers
20th-century American male musicians
American male songwriters